Harvey James Fraser (October 14, 1918 – November 15, 1996) was a professional ice hockey player who played 21 games in the National Hockey League.  He played with the Chicago Black Hawks. Harvey is the brother of Archie Fraser

References 

1918 births
1996 deaths
Canadian ice hockey centres
Chicago Blackhawks players
Cleveland Barons (1937–1973) players
Ice hockey people from Manitoba
New Haven Eagles players
St. Louis Flyers players
People from Souris, Manitoba
Providence Reds players
Wembley Monarchs players
Canadian expatriates in the United States